Supplemental Arrows-B is a Unicode block containing miscellaneous arrows, arrow tails, crossing arrows used in knot descriptions, curved arrows, and harpoons.

Block

Emoji
The Supplemental Arrows-B block contains two emoji:
U+2934–U+2935.

The block has four standardized variants defined to specify emoji-style (U+FE0F VS16) or text presentation (U+FE0E VS15) for the
two emoji, both of which default to a text presentation.

History
The following Unicode-related documents record the purpose and process of defining specific characters in the Supplemental Arrows-B block:

See also 
 Unicode symbols
 Mathematical operators and symbols in Unicode

References 

Unicode blocks